The Rotaliacea (sensu Sen Gupta, 1999) is a superfamily of mostly benthic foraminifera in the order Rotaliida.

References

 . 

Foraminifera superfamilies
Rotaliida